A Federal Flight Deck Officer (FFDO) is a Part 121 Airline Pilot who is trained and licensed to carry weapons and defend commercial aircraft against criminal activity and terrorism. The Federal Flight Deck Officer program is run by the Federal Air Marshal Service, and an officer's jurisdiction is the flight deck or cabin of a commercial airliner or a cargo aircraft while on duty. FFDOs are federal law enforcement officers sworn and deputized by the U.S. Department of Homeland Security.

History
Following the September 11 attacks in 2001, the Arming Pilots Against Terrorism Act, part of the Homeland Security Act of 2002, directed the Transportation Security Administration to develop the Federal Flight Deck Officer program as an additional layer of security. Under this program, flight crew members are authorized by the Transportation Security Administration to use firearms to defend against acts of criminal violence or air piracy undertaken to gain control of their aircraft. The first flight crew members that volunteered were pilots and flight engineers assigned to fly scheduled passenger air service under the FAR 121 (Domestic and Flag Air Carrier Operations).

In December 2003, President George W. Bush signed into law legislation that expanded program eligibility to include cargo pilots and certain other flight crew.

Selection
All applicants must be airline pilots or flight engineers for a U.S. based airline and hold an appropriate FAA medical certificate. At the time of application for the FFDO position the pilots must be in an active, non-furloughed airline employment, operating under FAR part 121 "Domestic and Flag Air Carrier Operation". Charter pilots, business aviation pilots, flight instructors, etc. those who are not operating under FAR part 121 are not eligible to participate. Applicants must be U.S. citizens and have the ability to pass extensive background checks. Initially, candidate selection preference was given to airline pilots who underwent prior government weapons training including former military and law enforcement experience.

Training
Akin to FAM Service, the specifics of FFDO training program are classified under 49 USC § 44939(e). The initial program is conducted at a Federal Law Enforcement Training Center (FLETC) facility by Federal Air Marshal Service instructors in New Mexico. Their training is tailored to the role that the FFDOs will perform while on duty. Some of the specific areas covered in this training include constitutional law, marksmanship, physical fitness, behavioral observation, defensive tactics, emergency medical assistance, and other law enforcement techniques. Simulators are used in the training program.

FFDOs are required to undergo multiple levels of frequent weapons re-qualification training and testing throughout their active service.

Jurisdiction
FFDOs can exercise their authority within a specific jurisdiction. In most cases, their jurisdiction is limited to defending the flight deck of a commercial passenger or cargo airliner.

Weapons
FFDOs are issued firearms and other support equipment by the U.S. Department of Homeland Security. The firearm types and their specifics are classified under 49 U.S. Code § 44921, however the Heckler & Koch USP Compact .40-caliber pistol - with the company's "LEM" trigger design - was selected for a 4-year contract in 2003 to supply as many as 9,600 pistols to FFDOs.

Participation and deployment
The exact number of active FFDOs and their distribution among airlines and flight routes is classified under 49 U.S. Code § 44921(d).
Their information is not retrievable under normal law enforcement inquiry methods so as to protect their identity and the integrity of the program.

Incidents
Despite predictions by opponents of the program of widespread incidents and accidents resulting from very large numbers of pilots carrying firearms in the cockpit, there have been no more reports of such events than any other law enforcement agencies.
The only serious incidents have been caused by TSA protocols that have since been abandoned.

On March 24, 2008, a US Airways FFDO's gun went off on Flight 1536 from Denver to Charlotte, North Carolina. No one was injured and the aircraft landed safely. According to the FFDO, the gun fired while he was trying to stow it. The bullet went through the side of the cockpit and tore a small hole in the exterior of the plane. The plane was pulled from service for repairs.

On January 13, 2011, a JetBlue FFDO's bag carrying his gun was accidentally picked up by a passenger flying to West Palm Beach, Florida.  When the passenger realized the bag wasn't hers, she notified a flight attendant. The FFDO's firearm was appropriately locked and secured and could not have been accessed or fired even if found.

In June 2015, a United Airlines FFDO threw live ammunition in the trash, then flushed it down a toilet on an international flight from Houston to Munich.

In February 2017, a Southwest Airlines FFDO disembarked a plane in Phoenix, Arizona, leaving a loaded firearm unattended in the cockpit, after the FFDO was accused by a flight attendant of watching footage from a camera hidden in the airplane's lavatory.

References

External links
TSA: Federal Flight Deck Officers
ALPA: The Federal Flight Deck Officer Program: A Model of Effectiveness and Efficiency in a Government/Industry Partnership
The United States Federal Air Marshal Service: A Historical Perspective, 1962 - 2012: "Fifty Years of Service

Aviation in the United States
Federal law enforcement agencies of the United States
United States Department of Homeland Security